Hoarders is an American reality television program which aired on A&E, from 2009 to 2013, on Lifetime in 2015, and again on A&E beginning in 2016.

Each episode follows one or two participants, each of whom is a compulsive hoarder. Throughout the episode, an organizational expert (who may also be psychiatrist, psychologist or a professional organizer specializing in some aspect involving the treatment of obsessive/compulsive disorders, anxiety disorders, and/or hoarding) works with the subject to address the situation and provide guidance in order to change hoarding behaviors.

After the sixth season concluded on February 4, 2013, the program went on a hiatus before it was announced, on September 25, 2013, that the show had been cancelled. In June 2015, Lifetime organized a revival of the show, after a number of successful "update" episodes which began in June 2014. These episodes are not part of a specific season since producers trimmed existing episodes to allow for an update of the participants at the end of the episode which lasted about four minutes. Lifetime aired the seventh season, under the title Hoarders: Family Secrets which focused less on the gross-out factor of the hoard and more on the human story of the hoarders along with their therapeutic healing process. The show returned to A&E on January 3, 2016 for season eight which also returned to showcasing the gruesome details of each hoard, such as animal skeletons being unearthed. The "Update" episodes continue to run between seasons and are branded under the titles Hoarders: Where Are They Now?, Hoarders: Then & Now or Hoarders: Overload.

As of May 17, 2021, a total of 136 episodes aired. Almost all episodes are available to watch on A&E's website or Amazon Prime.

Series overview

Episodes

Season 1 (2009)

Season 2 (2009–10)

Season 3 (2010–11)

Season 4 (2011)

Season 5 (2012)

Season 6 (2012–14)

Season 7: Family Secrets (2015)

Season 8 (2016)

Season 9 (2016–17)

Season 10 (2019)

Season 11 (2020)

Season 12 (2021)

Season 13 (2021)

"Update" Episodes

References

Lists of American non-fiction television series episodes